William Armand Thomas Tristan Garel-Jones, Baron Garel-Jones, PC (28 February 1941 – 23 March 2020) was a British politician. A member of the Conservative Party, he served as the Member of Parliament (MP) for Watford from 1979 to 1997, before being made a life peer in 1997.

Following his election to Parliament, Garel-Jones served in various whip positions and also as a junior minister at the Foreign and Commonwealth Office.

Early life
Born in Gorseinon, Wales, the son of Bernard Garel-Jones and Meriel (née Williams), he and his family moved first to Las Palmas in the Canary Islands prior to settling in Madrid, Spain, when he was seven years old. Garel-Jones was educated at the King's School, Canterbury. His parents established successful language schools in Spain during this time. He moved back to the United Kingdom and worked as a merchant banker prior to embarking on a career in politics.

Parliamentary career
Garel-Jones first contested Caernarvon in February 1974, but was defeated by the future leader of Plaid Cymru, Dafydd Wigley. He was elected for Watford at the 1979 General Election.

Whips Office

Viewed as an effective whip who successfully delivered parliamentary votes in favour of Thatcher's legislation, Garel-Jones was nonetheless seen as a mixture of Machiavelli and Ivan the Terrible by the Thatcherite right-wing.

Garel-Jones is said to have been the inspiration for the fictional scheming Whip Francis Urquhart in the novel House of Cards and subsequent BBC TV drama adaptation.

Europe

Garel-Jones was a leading pro-European, and remained so, despite the Conservative party moving to a more Eurosceptic position by the end of the Thatcher era. This created suspicion among right-wing Thatcherites, who thought of him as one of the "wets". However, he voted for Margaret Thatcher in the first round of the leadership challenge by Michael Heseltine, but reserved the right to vote against her if it went to a second round. He subsequently voted for Douglas Hurd.

After he stepped down from the House of Commons in 1997, he was given a life peerage as Baron Garel-Jones, of Watford in the County of Hertfordshire.

Other interests 
Garel-Jones was a well-known Hispanophile. A dedicated defender of bullfighting, he worked as a bullfighting critic. He was also a supporter of Humanists UK, and a vice chairman of the All-Party Parliamentary Humanist Group. He was an honorary associate of the National Secular Society.

Personal life 
In 1966, Garel-Jones married Catalina Garrigues Carnicer, niece of the Spanish bullfighting critic . They had four sons and a daughter. His death in Candeleda, Spain, where he lived, was announced on 24 March 2020.

In popular culture
Garel-Jones was portrayed by Hugh Fraser in the 2004 BBC production of The Alan Clark Diaries, and by Guy Henry in 2009's Margaret.

References

External links
 

|-

|-

1941 births
2020 deaths
Conservative Party (UK) life peers
Life peers created by Elizabeth II
Conservative Party (UK) MPs for English constituencies
UK MPs 1979–1983
UK MPs 1983–1987
UK MPs 1987–1992
UK MPs 1992–1997
Treasurers of the Household
Members of the Privy Council of the United Kingdom
People educated at The King's School, Canterbury
British humanists